Platythomisus is a genus of flattened crab spiders (family Thomisidae) from Africa and Southern Asia.

Description
Females reach a body length of about 20 mm, males grow up to four mm. The smooth, convex cephalothorax is quite large, with smooth, slender legs that are not particularly long. The legs are often free of spines, with the occasional exception on the first two pairs. The opisthosoma is stout and oval.

Platythomisus octomaculatus has a yellow-orange color with four round, black marks on the cephalothorax and seven large black marks on the opisthosoma, with one spot near the cephalothorax, and the other six following behind in two longitudinal rows. The legs are of a bright yellow, with the outer halves black.

Biology
Platythomisus octomaculatus is a rather rare species. One of the plants it has been found on is the yellow Hibiscus tiliaceus. In captivity it was observed to feed on bees.

Name
The genus name is combined from Ancient Greek platys "flat" and the name of the crab spider genus Thomisus.

Species
 Platythomisus deserticola Lawrence, 1936 — Southern Africa
 Platythomisus heraldicus Karsch, 1878 — East Africa, Zanzibar
 Platythomisus insignis Pocock, 1899 — Equatorial Guinea, Congo
 Platythomisus jubbi Lawrence, 1968 — South Africa
 Platythomisus jucundus Thorell, 1894 — Java
 Platythomisus nigriceps Pocock, 1899 — Equatorial Guinea, Ivory Coast
 Platythomisus octomaculatus (C. L. Koch, 1845) — Thailand, Malaysia, Singapore, Brunei, Indonesia
 Platythomisus pantherinus Pocock, 1898 — Malawi
 Platythomisus quadrimaculatus Hasselt, 1882 — Sumatra
 Platythomisus scytodimorphus (Karsch, 1886) — East Africa
 Platythomisus sexmaculatus Simon, 1897 — Somalia
 Platythomisus sibayius Lawrence, 1968 — South Africa
 Platythomisus sudeepi Biswas, 1977 — India, Sri Lanka
Platythomisus xiandao Lin & Li, 2019 — India, China

Footnotes

References
  (2000): An Introduction to the Spiders of South East Asia. Malaysian Nature Society, Kuala Lumpur.
  (2009): The world spider catalog, version 10.0. American Museum of Natural History.

External links
 Picture of an adult P. octomaculatus

Thomisidae
Araneomorphae genera
Spiders of Africa
Spiders of Asia